The Department of Education (WA) is the government department responsible for education in Western Australia as well as on Christmas Island and the Cocos (Keeling) Islands. The Department's head office, commonly referred to as 'Silver City' or 'Central Services', is located at 151 Royal Street in East Perth.

The department is led by its Director General, Lisa Rodgers, who is responsible to the Parliament of Western Australia and the Minister for Education, the Honourable Tony Buti, .

Public schools, sub-agencies and branches 
As of September 2021, the Department is responsible for managing 822 public schools in Western Australia. Each public school is located within one of 8 education regions, overseen by an Education Regional Office and Director of Education. The Department also oversees the registration, regulation and review of non-government schools in Western Australia.  

Additionally, there are a number of sub-agencies and branches of the Department:

Preceding agencies
 General Board of Education, 31 August 184717 August 1871
 Central Board of Education, 18 August 187112 October 1893 
 Education Department, 13 October 18931 July 1988
 Ministry of Education, 1 July 19881 January 1994 
 Education Department of Western Australia, 1 January 19943 February 2003
 Department of Education and Training, 3 February 2003 30 October 2009

See also

 Education in Australia
 Education in Western Australia
 List of schools in Western Australia

Notes

References

External links
 

Education
Education in Western Australia
Western Australia
2009 establishments in Australia
Government agencies established in 2009